The Cricket Writers' Club is an association for cricket journalists working in print, television or radio. It was established in 1947, and contains around 90% of those eligible for membership. During the 1946–47 Ashes series, the Australian and British cricket media spent around eight months travelling around together covering the matches, and during this time they established an informal "Empire Cricket Writers' Club". This placed the idea in the minds of a number of journalists for a formal association, and so in June 1947, the Cricket Writers' Club was started. 

Although it was established significantly later than other such organisations around the world, it triggered the creation of the Football Writers' Association and the Sports Writers' Association in the United Kingdom within six months. In 1950, the Cricket Writers' Club began awarding a Young Cricketer of the Year award, and have since introduced a number of other awards which are presented at their annual dinner.

References

External links
 Cricket Writers' Club website

1947 establishments in the United Kingdom
 
Cricket mass media
Sports journalism organizations in Europe
Journalism-related professional associations
Professional associations based in the United Kingdom
Sports organizations established in 1947